In the Church of Jesus Christ of Latter-day Saints (LDS Church), the priesthood is the power and authority to act in the name of God for the salvation of humankind. Male members of the church who meet standards of worthy behavior and church participation are generally ordained to specific offices within the priesthood.

Divisions
The priesthood authority is divided into two divisions or "orders": the Melchizedek priesthood and the Aaronic priesthood. The Melchizedek priesthood encompasses all priesthood authority; the Aaronic priesthood is therefore an appendage or subdivision of the Melchizedek priesthood.

Requirements for ordination
The Aaronic priesthood is conferred upon male church members beginning at age eleven by the laying on of hands by men who hold either an office in the Melchizedek priesthood or the office of priest in the Aaronic priesthood. Ordination to the priesthood is based on the recipient's personal moral worthiness and church participation without regard to education or other socioeconomic status, and, since 1978, without regard to race. (Previously, most members of black African descent were excluded from priesthood ordination.) To receive the Melchizedek priesthood in the church today, the recipient must hold the Aaronic priesthood and be at least 18 years old.  Some special cases may not permit initial or continuing ordination, such as children living with a same-sex couple.

If an adult man joins the LDS Church, he may first have the Aaronic priesthood conferred upon him. After a period of time (usually about one year), the man may have the Melchizedek priesthood conferred upon him.

Ordinance and oath and covenant
The church teaches that receiving the priesthood is a saving ordinance for males. Like all saving ordinances of the church, it is accompanied by the recipient making a covenant with God. In addition, the reception of the Melchizedek priesthood is said to constitute an "unspoken oath as well as [a] covenant". A manual for LDS Church priesthood holders states that "this means that Heavenly Father gives us His oath (guarantee) that we can have the power and blessings of the priesthood if we covenant (promise) with Him to do certain things." The recipient of the Melchizedek priesthood promises by covenant that he will "magnify" his assigned calling in the priesthood. In exchange, God promises by oath and covenant that the recipients will be "sanctified by the [Holy] Spirit unto the renewing of their bodies"; that they will become the sons of Moses and Aaron and the seed of Abraham; and that they will receive exaltation and ultimately receive all that God has.

Offices and quorums of the priesthood
Every holder of the priesthood is ordained to one or more priesthood offices. All priesthood holders have the same priesthood authority; however, the authority to exercise certain powers of the priesthood are divided according to priesthood office. A person may hold more than one priesthood office; in fact, once a person is ordained to a priesthood office, the person holds that priesthood office for as long as he holds the priesthood.

Offices of the Melchizedek priesthood

Quorums of the Melchizedek priesthood

Holders of priesthood offices are organized into quorums. The quorums are a brotherhood where members of the quorum assist each other, teach one another, and delegate particular responsibilities to individuals or committees. Often members of the church who do not maintain the standards and people who are not members of the church are invited to participate in the quorum to enjoy the brotherhood and support, although they may not be given certain quorum responsibilities.

In order to be called to the Aaronic priesthood office of bishop, a man must hold the Melchizedek priesthood and be a high priest.

Offices and quorums of the Aaronic priesthood

Priesthood leadership callings
In addition to the regular offices of the Aaronic or Melchizedek priesthood, there are other leadership callings within the priesthood. The table below lists these other priesthood leadership callings and the table below it shows how the various callings are organized within the hierarchy of the church.

Hierarchy of leadership

History

Because Latter-day Saints believe that priesthood authority and keys may be granted only by one who holds that authority or keys, they believe it is important that a person trace their priesthood through a line of succession from a person in the Bible who was known to hold that authority or keys. Moreover, Latter-day Saints believe that the priesthood authority was absent from the earth during the Great Apostasy, and that priesthood had to be restored through Joseph Smith. Catholic and Orthodox Christians do not believe that such a complete apostasy ever took place when defending the validity of their priesthoods, and these churches do not recognize the priesthood exercised by Latter-day Saints.

Latter-day Saints believe that ancient prophets and apostles conferred the priesthood directly upon Smith and other early members of the movement.

In 1834, Oliver Cowdery provided the first public announcement that the priesthood had been conferred by John the Baptist on May 15, 1829. Cowdery's account was essentially confirmed by Smith.

Unlike the restoration of the Aaronic priesthood, Smith never provided a date for the restoration of the Melchizedek priesthood, and never clearly indicated how this authority was conferred. Smith first specifically introduced the Melchizedek or high priesthood to the church in 1831. In his 1832 history, he referred to "a confirmation and reception of the high Priesthood after the holy order of the son of the living God power and ordinence from on high to preach the Gospel in the administration and demonstration of the spirit the Kees of the Kingdom of God conferred on him [Smith] and the continuation of the blessings of God to him &c".

Though specific details were lacking, by the turn of the 20th century, Latter-day Saint theologians were convinced that such a conferral had occurred prior to the organization of the Church of Christ on April 6, 1830.

In addition to the restoration of the Melchizedek priesthood (and the keys of the apostleship), additional priesthood keys were conferred on Joseph Smith and others. Smith dictated the following passage as a revelation following the dedication of the Kirtland Temple:

After this vision closed, the heavens were again opened unto us; and Moses appeared before us, and committed unto us the keys of the gathering of Israel from the four parts of the earth, and the leading of the ten tribes from the land of the north. After this, Elias appeared, and committed the dispensation of the gospel of Abraham, saying that in us and our seed all generations after us should be blessed. After this vision had closed, another great and glorious vision burst upon us; for Elijah the prophet, who was taken to heaven without tasting death, stood before us, and said: Behold, the time has fully come, which was spoken of by the mouth of Malachi—testifying that he [Elijah] should be sent, before the great and dreadful day of the Lord come—To turn the hearts of the fathers to the children, and the children to the fathers, lest the whole earth be smitten with a curse—Therefore, the keys of this dispensation are committed into your hands; and by this ye may know that the great and dreadful day of the Lord is near, even at the doors.

Use of the priesthood
Unrighteous dominion is a principle taught by the LDS Church which at its core holds that those given priesthood authority may not use that power as a means of imposing compliance to their will, especially in contravention of moral and ethical conduct. This teaching extends to all church members, in any area of responsibility, including personal and family relationships, church callings, business dealings, and public positions of trust. Church members are taught to identify it, and avoid it.

In a noted address on pride, LDS Church president Ezra Taft Benson said that unrighteous dominion is a form of contention and pride. The use of power or influence to cover-up sin, indulge in vain ambitions or self-righteous conduct is considered unrighteous dominion. Abuse, including verbal, physical, and sexual is considered unrighteous dominion.

Unrighteous dominion is considered a sin, for which repentance (and in some cases restitution) is required. It may also result in disciplinary actions by the church, which vary based on the nature and severity of the situation; a subsequent church president, Gordon B. Hinckley, specifically stated that "[a]ny man who engages in this practice is unworthy to hold a temple recommend." Penalties, up to and including excommunication, may come into play. If acts stemming from unrighteous dominion are criminal in nature, the church may be obliged to disclose the facts of the case to the proper law enforcement officials.

See also

Priesthood (Latter Day Saints)
High priest (Latter Day Saints)
Covenant (Latter Day Saints)
Laity
Stake and ward council meetings
Ordain Women
Ordinance (Latter Day Saints)
Black people and priesthood (LDS)

Further reading

Notes 

Latter Day Saint ordinances, rituals, and symbolism
 
1829 establishments in the United States
1829 in Christianity
Types of Latter Day Saint organization